Defenestration (from Modern Latin ) is the act of throwing someone or something out of a window.
The term was coined around the time of an incident in Prague Castle in the year 1618 which became the spark that started the Thirty Years' War. This was done in "good Bohemian style", referring to the defenestration which had occurred in Prague's New Town Hall almost 200 years earlier (July 1419), which also on that occasion led to the Hussite war. The word comes from the New Latin de- (down from) and fenestra (window or opening).

By extension, the term is also used to describe the forcible or peremptory removal of an adversary.

Origin 
The term originates from two incidents in history, both occurring in Prague. In 1419, seven town officials were thrown from the New Town Hall, precipitating the Hussite War. In 1618, two Imperial governors and their secretary were tossed from the Prague Castle, sparking the Thirty Years' War. These incidents, particularly that in 1618, were referred to as the Defenestrations of Prague and gave rise to the term and the concept.

The word itself is derived from New Latin defenestratio; with dē meaning "out" + fenestra meaning "window" + -atio  as a suffix indicating an action or process.

Notable cases 

 Around the 9th century BC, Queen Jezebel was defenestrated by her own eunuch servants, at the urging of Jehu, according to the Hebrew Bible.
 It has been suggested by several chronicles (notably the Annals of Westhide Abbey) that King John killed his nephew, Arthur of Brittany, by defenestration from the castle at Rouen, France, in 1203.
 In 1378, the crafts and their leader Wouter van der Leyden occupied the Leuven city hall and seized the Leuven government. Most of the patricians left the city and fled to Aarschot. After negotiations between the parties, they agreed to share the government. The patricians did not accept this easily, as it caused them to lose their absolute power. In an attempt to regain absolute control, they had Wouter van der Leyden assassinated in Brussels. Seeking revenge, the crafts handed over the patrician to a furious crowd. The crowd stormed the city hall and defenestrated the patricians. At least 15 patricians were killed during this defenestration of Leuven.
 In 1383, Bishop Dom Martinho was defenestrated by the citizens of Lisbon, having been suspected of conspiring with the enemy when Lisbon was besieged by the Castilians.
 In 1419 Hussite mob defenestrated a judge, the burgomaster, and some thirteen members of the town council of New Town of Prague.
 In 1452, King James II of Scotland murdered William Douglas, 8th Earl of Douglas, with his own hands and defenestrated him at Stirling Castle.
 On April 26, 1478, after the failure of the "Pazzi conspiracy" to murder the ruler of Florence, Lorenzo de' Medici, Jacopo de' Pazzi was defenestrated.
 In 1483, Prague's Old-Town portreeve and the bodies of seven murdered New-Town aldermen were defenestrated.
 On May 16, 1562, Adham Khan, Akbar's general and foster brother, was defenestrated twice for murdering a rival general, Ataga Khan, who had been recently promoted by Akbar. Akbar was woken up in the tumult after the murder. He struck Adham Khan down personally with his fist and immediately ordered his defenestration by royal order. The first time, his legs were broken as a result of the  fall from the ramparts of Agra Fort but he remained alive. Akbar, in a rare act of cruelty probably exacerbated by his anger at the loss of his favorite general, ordered his defenestration a second time, killing him. Adham Khan had wrongly counted on the influence of his mother and Akbar's wet nurse, Maham Anga, to save him as she was almost an unofficial regent in the days of Akbar's youth. Akbar personally informed Maham Anga of her son's death, to which she famously commented, "You have done well." She died 40 days later of acute depression.
 In 1572, French King Charles IX's friend, the Huguenot leader Gaspard de Coligny, was killed in accordance with the wishes of Charles' mother, Catherine de' Medici. Charles had allegedly said "then kill them all that no man be left to reproach me". Thousands of Huguenots were killed in the St. Bartholomew's Day massacre after soldiers attacked Coligny in his house, stabbed him, and defenestrated him.
 In 1618, rebel Protestant leaders in Prague defenestrate two Catholic Royal regents and their secretary, who survived the  fall out of the windows of Prague Castle.
 On the morning of December 1, 1640, in Lisbon, a group of supporters of the Duke of Braganza party found Miguel de Vasconcelos, the hated Portuguese Secretary of State of the Habsburg Philip III, hidden in a closet, killed him and defenestrated him. His corpse was left to the public outrage.
 On June 27, 1844, Joseph Smith, founder of the Latter Day Saint movement, was shot and pushed out of one of the windows of the Carthage Jail in Carthage, Illinois while attempting to escape a mob. 
 On June 11, 1903, a group of Serbian army officers murdered and defenestrated King Alexander and Queen Draga.
 In 1922, Italian politician and writer Gabriele d'Annunzio was temporarily crippled after falling from a window, possibly pushed by a follower of Benito Mussolini.
 In March to April 1932, Ivanovo region of Soviet Union, due to ration cuts and labor intensification measures, strikes and spontaneous assemblies broke out. Ten thousand demonstrators ransacked the party and police buildings with slogans like "Toss the Communists . . . out the window." 
 On March 10, 1948, the Czechoslovakian minister of foreign affairs Jan Masaryk was found dead, in his pyjamas, in the courtyard of the Foreign Ministry below his bathroom window. The initial investigation stated that he committed suicide by jumping out of the window, although some believe that he was murdered by the ascendant Communists. A 2004 police investigation into his death concluded that, contrary to the initial ruling, he did not commit suicide, but was defenestrated, most likely by Czechoslovak Communists and their Soviet NKVD advisers for his opposition to the February 1948 Communist putsch.
 On November 28, 1953, the U.S. biological warfare specialist Frank Olson died after a fall from a hotel window that has been suggested to have been an assassination by the CIA.
 In 1962, Communist Party of Spain member Julián Grimau was seemingly tortured and then defenestrated from the premises of the Dirección General de Seguridad in Madrid suffering fractures to the wrists and serious skull injuries, prior to his execution in 1963.
 On April 15, 1966, two suspects in the so-called Bathroom Coup in Sri Lanka, Corporal Tilekawardene and L. V. Podiappuhamy (otherwise known as Dodampe Mudalali), were said by the Criminal Investigations Department (CID) to have jumped to their deaths from the fourth floor of the CID building in the Fort. At the inquest, following receipt of new evidence, the magistrate altered the verdict of suicide to one of culpable homicide. The remainder of the suspects were acquitted.
 In 1968, the son of China's future paramount leader Deng Xiaoping, Deng Pufang, was thrown from a window by Red Guards during the Cultural Revolution.
 In 1969, Italian Anarchist Giuseppe Pinelli was seen falling to his death from a fourth floor window of the Milan police station after being arrested because of claims of his involvement in the Piazza Fontana bombing, of which he was later cleared.
 In 1970, Turkish idealist student Ertuğrul Dursun Önkuzu was defenestrated from the third floor of a school by a group of left-wing students in Ankara.
 In 1977, as a result of political backlash against her son Fela Kuti's album Zombie, Funmilayo Ransome-Kuti was thrown from a second-story window during a military raid by one thousand Nigerian soldiers on Kuti's compound, the Kalakuta Republic. The injuries sustained from the fall led Ransome-Kuti to lapse into a coma; she would remain in a coma for more than a year, and eventually succumb to her injuries on 13 April 1978. Ransome-Kuti's death would be commemorated in her son's protest song "Coffin for Head of State".
 The 2000 Ramallah lynching included throwing the (already-dead) body of either Vadim Nurzhitz or Yossi Avrahami out of a second-floor window, after those two Israeli soldiers had been lynched.
 On March 2, 2007, Russian investigative journalist Ivan Safronov, who was researching the Kremlin's covert arms deals, fell to his death from a fifth floor window. Friends and colleagues discounted suicide as a reason, and an investigation was opened looking into possible "incitement to suicide".
 In 2007 in Gaza, gunmen allegedly affiliated with Hamas killed a Fatah supporter by defenestration, an act repeated the next day when a Hamas supporter was defenestrated by alleged supporters of Fatah.
 In 2017, retired French physician and teacher Sarah Halimi was killed in an attack on her home near Paris that ended with her being pushed from a third-floor window. Her death was widely perceived as an example of Islamist terrorism and antisemitism. Her assailant was ruled to be not criminally responsible due to having committed the act in a psychotic episode brought on by his heavy use of cannabis.
 On September 1, 2022, Ravil Maganov, a Russian businessman who had criticized the country's invasion of Ukraine, died after falling from a window of a hospital in Moscow on the same day the hospital was visited by Russian President Vladimir Putin. Some people who knew Maganov well said his death was unlikely to have been a suicide, and some media hypothesized a connection with various other mysterious deaths of Russian businessmen that had occurred in recent months.

Notable autodefenestrations 

Autodefenestration (or self-defenestration) is the term used for the act of jumping, propelling oneself, or causing oneself to fall, out of a window. 
 In the Acts of the Apostles in the New Testament, the accidental autodefenestration of a young man of Troas named Eutychus is recorded. The Apostle Paul was travelling to Jerusalem and had stopped for seven days in Troas. While Paul was preaching in a third-story room late on a Sunday night to the local assembly of Christian believers, Eutychus drifted off to sleep and fell out of the window in which he was sitting. The text indicates that Eutychus did not survive but was brought back to life after Paul embraced him.
In December 1840, Abraham Lincoln and four other Illinois legislators jumped out of a window in a political maneuver designed to prevent a quorum on a vote that would have eliminated the Illinois State Bank.
During the Revolutions of 1848, an agitated crowd forced their way into the town hall in Cologne and two city councillors panicked and jumped out of the window; one of them broke both his legs. The event went down in the city's history as the "Cologne Defenestration".
 In 1991, British informer Martin McGartland was abducted by members of the Provisional IRA. As he waited to be interrogated, McGartland escaped the IRA by jumping from a third floor window in a Twinbrook flat where he had been taken for interrogation following his abduction, and survived the fall.
 On July 9, 1993, the prominent Toronto attorney Garry Hoy fell from a 24th story window in an attempt to demonstrate to a group of new legal interns that the windows of the city's Toronto-Dominion Centre were unbreakable. He had performed the same stunt on several previous occasions – dramatically slamming his body against the window – but this time it popped out of its frame and he fell to his death. The accident was commemorated by a 1996 Darwin Award and has been re-enacted in several films and television shows.
In 1995, the French philosopher Gilles Deleuze jumped from his Paris apartment to his death.
In 1999, popular German Schlager singer Rex Gildo committed suicide by jumping out of the window of his apartment building.
In 2001, at least 104 people jumped out of the Twin Towers on 9/11.

In popular culture 
 In his poem Defenestration, R. P. Lister wrote with amusement about the creation of so exalted a word for so basic a concept. The poem narrates the thoughts of a philosopher undergoing defenestration. As he falls, the philosopher considers why there should be a particular word for the experience, when many equally simple concepts do not have specific names. In an evidently ironic commentary on the word, Lister has the philosopher summarize his thoughts with, "I concluded that the incidence of logodaedaly was purely adventitious."
 There is a range of hacker witticisms referring to "defenestration". For example, the term is sometimes used humorously among Linux users to describe the act of removing Microsoft Windows from a computer.

References

External links

Windows
Homicide
Falling
Execution methods
Suicide methods